P. M. de Respour, a Flemish metallurgist and alchemist, was the first person to extract metallic zinc from zinc oxide in 1668.

Original works 
 De Respour, P. M.: Rare Experiences svr l'esprit mineral..' Paris, France (1668)

References

Dutch alchemists
Flemish metallurgists
17th-century alchemists